Rev. Charles Gough Littlehales M.A. (20 May 1871 – 28 August 1945) was an English cricketer.  Littlehales was a right-handed batsman who fielded as a wicket-keeper.  He was born at Bulphan, Essex and was educated at Forest School, Walthamstow, before later attending Exeter College, Oxford.

Littlehales made his first-class debut for Essex against Surrey in the 1896 County Championship.  He made five further first-class appearances for Essex, the last of which came against Leicestershire in the 1904 County Championship.  In his six first-class appearances, he scored 109 runs at an average of 12.11, with a high score of 23.  Behind the stumps he took 4 catches and made a single stumping.

A member of the Anglican Clergy, Littlehales worked as parish Vicar at Allensmore, Herefordshire from 1930 to at least 1941.  Littlehales died at Wickham Bishops, Essex on 28 August 1945.

References

External links
Charles Littlehales at ESPNcricinfo
Charles Littlehales at CricketArchive

1871 births
1945 deaths
People educated at Forest School, Walthamstow
Alumni of Exeter College, Oxford
English cricketers
Essex cricketers
20th-century English Anglican priests
People from Bulphan
Wicket-keepers